Orient Long Beach Bar Light is a lighthouse off Orient, New York. It was originally a screwpile lighthouse that was later converted to concrete caisson foundation. Its early appearance as a screwpile lighthouse gave it the nickname "Bug Light" as there were no other such lighthouses in the vicinity.

The Long Beach Bar Light was destroyed in 1963 by fire.  A replica was rebuilt upon the surviving foundation. The building was reassembled in 1990, and re-activated as a navigational aid in 1993.

The Archives Center at the Smithsonian National Museum of American History has a collection (#1055) of souvenir postcards of lighthouses and has digitized 272 of these and made them available online.  These include postcards of Orient Long Beach Bar Light with links to customized nautical charts provided by National Oceanographic and Atmospheric Administration.

References

Gallery

External links
 
 Long Island Lighthouses: Long Beach Bar Lighthouse 

Lighthouses completed in 1871
Houses completed in 1871
Lighthouses in Suffolk County, New York